Anthony Gosselin (born July 13, 1992) is a professional Canadian football fullback for the Ottawa Redblacks of the Canadian Football League (CFL).

Early career
Gosselin played football in CEGEP for the Drummondville Voltigeurs from 2010 to 2013. He then played U Sports football for the Sherbrooke Vert et Or from 2014 to 2016.

Professional career
Gosselin was drafted by the Ottawa Redblacks in the second round with the 18th overall pick in the 2017 CFL Draft and signed with the team on May 16, 2018. After training camp that year, he was named to the active roster and made his professional debut on June 23, 2017 against the Calgary Stampeders. He played in the first four regular season games and the last four games that season while spending the other games on the disabled list, injured list, and reserve roster. Gosselin played in his first post-season game on November 12, 2017 in the East Semi-Final loss to the Saskatchewan Roughriders.

In 2018, Gosselin played in six regular season games and had two receptions for four yards. In the 2019 season, he played in 15 games where he had three receptions for 18 yards and also had four special teams tackles. He did not play in 2020 with the cancellation of the 2020 CFL season. He re-signed with the Redblacks to a one-year extension on December 17, 2020.

References

External links
Ottawa Redblacks bio

Living people
1992 births
Canadian football fullbacks
Ottawa Redblacks players
Players of Canadian football from Quebec
People from Montérégie
Sherbrooke Vert et Or football players